"Just Cruisin" is a song by American rapper and actor Will Smith. It features on Men in Black: The Album and the UK release of his debut studio album, Big Willie Style (1997). Released on November 25, 1997, in Europe only, the song reached the top 40 in several countries, including Norway and Sweden, where the single peaked within the top 20. In New Zealand, the song was issued as a double A-side with "Gettin' Jiggy wit It" and peaked at number six.

Release
"Just Cruisin'" first appeared on the soundtrack Men in Black: The Album and was also available on the UK release on Big Willie Style. The song was written by Will Smith and produced by The Trackmasters, then known as Poke & Tone; the vocals were sung by actress Tichina Arnold. The single found some success, reaching the top 20 in Norway and Sweden and peaking at number 23 on the UK Singles Chart.

Critical reception
British magazine Music Week rated the song four out of five, noting that it "profiles Smith at his laid-back best."

Music video
An accompanying music video directed by Robert Caruso was released and got some playing time on the likes of MTV and BET. The video features Smith driving around Los Angeles and New York City in his car. The car can transform into a boat or a jet fighter and can also clean itself at the touch of a button.

Track listings
 UK CD1
 "Just Cruisin'" (original version) – 4:00
 "Just Cruisin'" (Trackmasters Remix) – 4:11
 "Just Cruisin'" (instrumental) – 3:59
 "Big Willie Style" (Snippets) – 2:36

 UK CD2
 "Just Cruisin'" (original version) – 4:00
 "Big Willie Style" (album version) – 3:48
 "It's All Good" (album version) – 4:11

Charts

Weekly charts

Year-end charts

Release history

References

Will Smith songs
1997 singles
1997 songs
Columbia Records singles
Song recordings produced by Trackmasters
Songs written by Will Smith